Hinderwell railway station was a railway station on the Whitby Redcar and Middlesbrough Union Railway. It was opened on 3 December 1883, and served the villages of Hinderwell and Runswick Bay. However, the northbound side was not furnished with a platform until 1908. The station closed to all traffic on 5 May 1958.

The station buildings have all been demolished, and small industrial units occupy the site. However, the former railway cottages are still (February 2008) extant, albeit modernised and extended.

References

Further reading

External links
 Hinderwell station on navigable 1947 O. S. map

Disused railway stations in the Borough of Scarborough
Former North Eastern Railway (UK) stations
Railway stations in Great Britain opened in 1883
Railway stations in Great Britain closed in 1958